Nathan Clifford (born June 17, 1867) was an American lawyer, businessman and politician from Portland, Maine. Clifford, a Democrat, served as Mayor of Portland from 1906 to 1907 after defeating incumbent James Phinney Baxter. He later was elected President of the Maine Senate in 1911. He was the only Democrat to hold that office from Luther Moore in 1854 and Carlton Day Reed Jr. in 1964.

Early life and family
Clifford grew up in Portland before graduating from Harvard College in 1890. After studying the law under his father, he was admitted to the Maine bar in 1893. He married Caroline Devens in Boston in May 1897.

His grandfather, who was also named Nathan Clifford, was an Associate Justice of the Supreme Court of the United States from 1858 to 1881. His father, William Henry Clifford, was a successful attorney. Clifford studied law with his father and the two were eventually partners in the law firm Clifford, Verrill, and Clifford.

References

1867 births
Year of death missing
Harvard College alumni
Mayors of Portland, Maine
Businesspeople from Maine
Maine lawyers
Presidents of the Maine Senate
Democratic Party Maine state senators